Jur Vrieling (born 31 July 1969) is a Dutch show jumping rider. He was born in Slochteren. He competed at the 2012 Summer Olympics in London.

References

1969 births
Living people
People from Slochteren
Dutch show jumping riders
Olympic equestrians of the Netherlands
Dutch male equestrians
Equestrians at the 2012 Summer Olympics
Equestrians at the 2016 Summer Olympics
Olympic silver medalists for the Netherlands
Olympic medalists in equestrian
Medalists at the 2012 Summer Olympics
Sportspeople from Groningen (province)